The 1881–82 Irish Cup was the second edition of the premier knock-out cup competition in Irish football. The competition began in January 1882 with the first round and ended on 13 May 1882 with the final. Queen's Island won the tournament for the only time in their brief history, including eliminating the holders Moyola Park in the quarter-finals.

The final was played between Queen's Island and Cliftonville and ended in a 1–0 victory to the former.

Results

First round

|}

Replays

|}

Castlederg, Cliftonville and Avoniel all advanced to the next round after Strabane did not play their replay with Castlederg.

Quarter-finals

|}

Replays

|}

A second replay was ordered between Avoniel and Distillery after protests that the match was ended four minutes early.

Second replay

|}

Semi-finals

|}

Queen's Island advanced after Castlederg failed to turn up.

Replay

|}

Second replay

|}

Final

References

External links
 Northern Ireland Cup Finals. Rec.Sport.Soccer Statistics Foundation (RSSSF)

Irish Cup seasons
1881–82 domestic association football cups
1881–82 in Irish association football